Ramzi Souli (born 30 June 1980 in Numansdorp) is a sailor from the Netherlands, who represented his country at the 2012 Vintage Yachting Games in Bellano Italy. Souli on the fordeck together with helmsman Rudy den Outer and Gavin Lidlow in the middle took the Silver medal in the Soling. During the 2012 Soling Europeans in Aarhus, Denmark as well as at the 2014 Soling Europeans in Saint-Pierre-Quiberon, France the same team  took the 3rd place.
Together with Rudy den Outer and Theo de Lange Ramzi became European Champion in the Soling at Mandello del Lario, Italy in 2021,
Ramzi holds several Dutch titles in the Soling. He is member of the Kralingsche Zeil Club in Rotterdam.

Personal life 
Souli lives and works in Numansdorp as research and development specialist for equipment in the process industry.

References

1980 births
Living people
Dutch male sailors (sport)
Europe class sailors
People from Cromstrijen
European Champions Soling
Sportspeople from South Holland
21st-century Dutch people